The following radio stations broadcast on AM frequency 1215 kHz:

Australia
ABC Midwest & Wheatbelt, only Midwest broadcasts at 1215 kHz.

China 
 CNR Radio The Greater Bay

Philippines
DYRF-AM, also known as Radio Fuerza is a radio station in The Philippines that broadcasts at 1215 kHz.

United Kingdom
Absolute Radio, a British independent national radio station, it was on 1215 kHz Medium wave until the closure of medium wave transmissions on 20 January 2023.

References

Lists of radio stations by frequency